Código Postal (lit. "Postal code") is a Mexican youth telenovela produced by José Alberto Castro for Televisa in 2006.

The serial takes place in Acapulco, a popular tourist destination in the state of Guerrero, Mexico. The series is set within an exclusive gated community where the bulk of the cast resides. Like many Mexican telenovelas the cast comprises young, attractive actors, and many of the plotlines revolve around suspense, heavy struggles, love and romance.

On Monday, May 29, 2006, Canal de las Estrellas started broadcasting Código Postal weekdays at 6:30pm, replacing Rebelde. The last episode was broadcast on Friday, February 23, 2007 with Lola...Érase una vez replacing it the following Monday.

Jery Sandoval which was replaced by Africa Zavala and José Ron starred as protagonists, Altair Jarabo, Imanol Landeta, Eugenio Siller, Jacqueline García, Ulises de la Torre and Claudia Godínez starred as young co-protagonists, while Andrea García, Jessica Coch, Ana Bertha Espín and Guillermo García Cantú starred as antagonists.

Cast

Main
África Zavala as Victoria Villarreal 
Jery Sandoval as Regina Corona
José Ron as Patricio González de la Vega Mendoza/Patricio Zubieta Mendoza
Andrea García as Ivette Fernández de de Alba
Jessica Coch as Juana "Joanna" Villarreal
Ana Bertha Espín as Jessica Mendoza de González de la Vega/Jessica Mendoza de Zubieta
Guillermo García Cantú as Claudio Garza Moheno
Altair Jarabo as Afrodita Carvajal
Imanol Landeta as Pablo Rojas Alonso
Eugenio Siller as Rafael Rojas Alonso
Jacqueline García as Marcela Garza Durán
Ulises de la Torre as Ezequiel Gutiérrez Santos
Claudia Godínez as Inés Garza Durán

Supporting
 
Verónica Castro as Beatríz Corona
Roberto Blandón as Raúl González de la Vega
Gabriela Goldsmith as Minerva Carvajal
Diego Dreyfus as Óscar Zubieta
Aarón Hernán as Don Guillermo de Alba
Leticia Perdigón as Esperanza Santos de Gutiérrez
Rafael Inclán as Avelino Gutiérrez
Arlette Pacheco as Gloria Durán de Garza
Luz María Jerez as Irene Alonso de Rojas
Marco Muñoz as Adrián Garza Moheno
Luis Gatica as Germán de Alba
Roberto Ballesteros as Bruno Zubieta
Rafael Puente Jr. as Héctor Garza Durán
Michelle Ramaglia as Daniela Gutiérrez Santos
Jorge Consejo as Ignacio Ibargüengoitia Rosas-Priego
Jaye Alonzo Topete as Rodrigo Marquéz
Mariana Rountree as Alexa Torres-Landa Haddad
Carolina Rincón as Venus Carvajal
Ferdinando Valencia as Guillermo "Memo" de Alba Fernández
Daniel Berlanga as Luca Villarreal
Elsa Cárdenas as Josefina de Alba
Miguel Pérez as Jesús "Chuy" Gutiérrez Santos
Renata Notni as Andrea Garza Durán
Lucía Pailles as Toña*Beatriz Monroy as Flora
Evelyn Solares as Chole*Martin Navarrete as
Poncho Denigris as Mateo Ayala
 Úrsula Montserrat as Rocío de la Peña
 Ilithya Manzanilla as Dafne de la Peña
 Rodrigo Santacruz as Willy

Notable guest stars
Adal Ramones as Himself
Yordi Rosado as Himself
Mauricio Castillo as Himself
Carlos Loret de Mola as Himself

Awards

References

External links

 at esmas.com 

2006 telenovelas
Mexican telenovelas
2006 Mexican television series debuts
2007 Mexican television series endings
Spanish-language telenovelas
Television shows set in Acapulco
Televisa telenovelas
Children's telenovelas
Teen telenovelas